Wild & Loose is the debut album from American hip hop group Oaktown's 357, released in March 1989. The album was produced by MC Hammer and James Earley, via Hammer's Bust It Records label and Capitol Records.

The album peaked at number 126 on the Billboard 200, and at number 23 on the Top R&B Albums chart. The single "Yeah, Yeah, Yeah" peaked at number 9 on the Billboard Hot Rap Songs chart. 

Rap Reviews gave the song, lyrics and music video an overall score of four.

"Stupid Def Ya'll" was originally released by Hammer (aka the Holy Ghost Boy and the Posse) as "Stupid Def Yal" in 1987.

Track listing

Chart positions

References 

1989 debut albums
Albums produced by MC Hammer
Capitol Records albums
Oaktown's 357 albums